Alexis Vastine (17 November 1986 – 9 March 2015) was a French boxer who won a bronze medal at the 2008 Summer Olympics in the Light Welterweight division. He also competed in the 2012 Summer Olympics, where he was eliminated in the quarterfinals in a controversial decision. He died in the Villa Castelli helicopter collision during the filming of French TV reality show Dropped for the TF1 network.

Career
At the 2004 junior world championships, Vastine was knocked out by Amir Khan at lightweight and won bronze.

At the 2007 senior world championships in Chicago, he was outpointed by Bradley Saunders at junior welter but qualified for the Olympics.

At the 2008 Olympics, Vastine reached the semifinal where he faced Manuel Félix Díaz from the Dominican Republic. With Vastine leading by two in the final round, the Dominican fighter made a comeback and won the fight. Vastine lost the match by two points after being penalised twice by the referee, having four points deducted from his score. France 24 reported:

The Agence France-Presse described the referee's ruling as "controversial". Diaz, however, went on to win the gold medal.

Vastine went on to suffer what was widely seen as an unjust decision at the 2012 Olympics in London, where he drew on points but lost on countback to top-seeded welterweight Taras Shelestyuk of Ukraine in the quarter-finals, thus missing out on a medal.

Olympic games results
2008 (as a Light welterweight)
Defeated Egidijus Kavaliauskas (Lithuania) 13–2
Defeated Bradley Saunders (Great Britain) 11–7
Defeated Uranchimegiin Mönkh-Erdene (Mongolia) 12–4
Lost to Manuel Félix Díaz (Dominican Republic) 10–12
2012 (as a Welterweight)
Defeated Patrick Wojcicki (Germany) 16-12
Defeated Byambyn Tüvshinbat (Mongolia) 13-12
Lost to Taras Shelestyuk (Ukraine) 18+-18

World amateur championships results
2007 (as a Light welterweight)
Defeated Dilshod Mahmudov (Uzbekistan) 28–27
Defeated Edward Akora (Uganda) RSCO 3
Defeated Vasili Belous (Moldava) 27–10
Lost to Bradley Saunders (England) 13–30

Death

On 9 March 2015, as part of a group of French sports stars participating in a reality TV show called Dropped, Vastine was one of 10 people who died when helicopters collided in mid-air during filming in northwestern Argentina. His 21-year-old sister Célie, also an amateur boxer, had been killed in a car accident in France just two months before.

References

External links
 2004 results
 
 

1986 births
2015 deaths
French people of Russian descent
Light-welterweight boxers
Boxers at the 2008 Summer Olympics
Boxers at the 2012 Summer Olympics
Olympic boxers of France
Olympic bronze medalists for France
Olympic medalists in boxing
Medalists at the 2008 Summer Olympics
French male boxers
People with mood disorders
Sportspeople from Eure
Victims of helicopter accidents or incidents
Victims of aviation accidents or incidents in Argentina
Knights of the Ordre national du Mérite
Mediterranean Games gold medalists for France
Competitors at the 2005 Mediterranean Games
Competitors at the 2009 Mediterranean Games
Mediterranean Games medalists in boxing
Victims of aviation accidents or incidents in 2015